= Kenya Plant Health Inspectorate Services =

Kenyan government regulatory agency

KEPHIS Logo

Kenya Plant Health Inspectorate Service (KEPHIS) is a government regulatory agency responsible for Assurance on the quality of Agriculture inputs and produce. It was formed under Plant Protection Act, (Cap 324) and its mission is to provide a science based regulatory service by assuring plant health, quality of agricultural inputs and produce for food security, globally competitive agriculture and sustainable development.
